For the 19th century political figure see Louis-Joseph Papineau

Louis-Joseph Papineau (January 3, 1861 – April 24, 1932) was a Canadian politician and lawyer. He was first elected to the House of Commons of Canada in the 1908 federal election as the Liberal MP for Beauharnois, Quebec. He crossed the floor to join the Conservatives and was re-elected in the 1911 federal election. As a result of the Conscription Crisis of 1917, Papineau crossed the floor yet again to rejoin his old party and was re-elected in the 1917 federal election as a Laurier Liberal. He was re-elected in 1921, again as a Liberal before retiring from parliament with the 1925 federal election.

He was elected to the Legislative Assembly of Quebec in Beauharnois in the 1927 Quebec election for the Quebec Liberal Party.  He did not run for re-election in 1931.

Electoral record

References
 
 

1861 births
1932 deaths
Conservative Party of Canada (1867–1942) MPs
Liberal Party of Canada MPs
Members of the House of Commons of Canada from Quebec